Events from the year 1237 in Ireland.

Incumbent
Lord: Henry III

Events
Alan de Sanctafide appointed Lord Chancellor of Ireland
Geoffrey de Turville appointed Lord Chancellor of Ireland
Ralph de Norwich appointed Lord Chancellor of Ireland

Births

Deaths

References

 
1230s in Ireland
Ireland
Years of the 13th century in Ireland